Mikhail Igorevich Davletov (born July 8, 1987) is a Russian former professional ice hockey right winger.

Davletov played 30 games in the Russian Superleague for HC MVD during the 2006–07 season where he scored no points. He also played in the Vysshaya Liga for HC Khimik Voskresensk, HC Belgorod, HC Ryazan, Titan Klin, Gazprom-OGU Orenburg and HC Sarov as well as the league's successor the Supreme Hockey League for HC Izhstal. He also had a brief spell in the Kazakhstan Hockey Championship for Arystan Temirtau.

References

External links

1987 births
Living people
Arystan Temirtau players
Gazprom-OGU Orenburg players
HC Izhstal players
HC Khimik Voskresensk players
HC MVD players
Russian ice hockey right wingers
HC Ryazan players
HC Sarov players
Ice hockey people from Moscow